"With Arms Wide Open" is a song by American rock band Creed. It was released on April 18, 2000, as the third single from their second studio album, Human Clay. The song reached number one on the US Billboard Hot 100 in November 2000, becoming the band's first and only song to top the chart. The song also received honors at the 43rd Annual Grammy Awards in 2001, being nominated for Best Rock Vocal Performance by a Duo or Group, as well as Scott Stapp and Mark Tremonti winning the Grammy Award for Best Rock Song.

Writing and recording
Scott Stapp began writing the lyrics to the song in early 1998 during the My Own Prison tour, when he found out that his then wife Hillaree Burns was pregnant with his first child, Jagger. According to Stapp the song was written in 15 minutes at soundcheck. Stapp overheard guitarist Mark Tremonti playing and loved what he heard so much that he ran in and told Tremonti to just keep playing as Stapp began singing his lyrics.

Music and lyrics
Stapp wrote the lyrics when he found out, with great surprise, that he was going to be a father. The original lyrics to the song were written from the perspective of having a daughter, even though his wife was pregnant with a boy, as Stapp used "she" during early live performances. This would eventually be changed when Stapp found out he would be having a son. In later years Stapp would not use "he" or "she" in reference to the child but rather "they" to refer to both his sons and daughter. In a 2013 interview with Songfacts, Stapp said of the song:

Musically the song is a power ballad written in the key of C major, with Tremonti playing in drop D tuning and Stapp singing in his signature baritone singing voice. According to Stapp, following the massive crossover success of the single which he felt led to the song being heavily overplayed, so much so that even his then-wife would turn away from it, and upon hearing impersonations of other people mimicking his vocal delivery in a dramatic, over-the-top fashion he purposely began to alter his vocal style which he feels has helped him grow as a vocalist. He states "I don't know where I picked up all the idiosyncrasies of how I enunciate and I've been called out on my vowels ... But it's actually helped me as a singer because I've heard that and I've intentionally enunciated differently on different words and syllables, so thank you world for pointing out a consistent pattern early in my 20s so I could evolve and grow as a singer. You made me better. Thank you."
 
Three main versions of the song exist. One is the original album version. The second is the radio version, which adds additional hi-hat and drums, and also edits out the ending. The third is the video version (or "Strings Remix") which adds strings to the radio version.

Release and reception
"With Arms Wide Open" reached number one on the US Billboard Hot Mainstream Rock Tracks chart for four weeks in July 2000 and is Creed's only track to appear on the Billboard Adult Contemporary chart, where it peaked at number 29 in March 2001. In October, the song entered the top 10 of Billboards Adult Top 40 chart and later topped the listing for eight weeks. It also reached number one on the Billboard Hot 100 on the issue dated November 11, 2000, for one week, becoming their first and only number one on the chart. The music video topped VH1's top ten countdown in 2000. On May 10, 2019, nearly 20 years after the release of Human Clay, the single was certified gold by the Recording Industry Association of America (RIAA) for sales of over 500,000 digital units. On November 30, 2020, the certification was upgraded to double platinum for sales and streams of over two million units.

The title became the name of a foundation set up by Stapp to help children and families. To launch the With Arms Wide Open Foundation, the band released a limited edition "enhanced-package single" in September 2000, with proceeds going to the charity to "promote healthy, loving relationships between children and their families". The single contained an orchestrated version, a rock version, an acoustic reading, and the music video. In February 2001, Scott Stapp and Mark Tremonti were nominated for and won the Grammy Award for Best Rock Song as the writers of "With Arms Wide Open". The song was also nominated for Best Rock Vocal Performance by a Duo or Group with Vocal but lost to U2 for "Beautiful Day". The music video for "With Arms Wide Open" was voted the 92nd best music video of all-time by VH1, who also ranked it number four on its "25 Greatest Power Ballads" list.

Foo Fighters frontman Dave Grohl described "With Arms Wide Open" as "one of the most amazing songs of all time".

Appearances in media
Creed performed the song live on the July 16, 2000, episode of The Tonight Show with Jay Leno, and on November 30, 2000, at the first annual My VH1 Music Awards. The song was made available as downloadable content for the video games Rocksmith 2014 on September 16, 2014, and Rock Band 4 on May 21, 2020. A cinematic cover version of the song, performed by Nicole Serrano and Tommee Profitt, was used in a February 2022 ad campaign to promote the 94th Academy Awards.

Track listings

US limited-edition minimax CD single (60150-18004-2)
 "With Arms Wide Open" (strings version)
 "With Arms Wide Open" (acoustic version)
 "With Arms Wide Open" (rock version)
 "With Arms Wide Open" (video)

UK CD single (670695 2)
 "With Arms Wide Open" (new version) – 3:42
 "With Arms Wide Open" (strings version) – 3:55
 "With Arms Wide Open" (acoustic version) – 3:55
 "With Arms Wide Open" (album version) – 4:26
 "With Arms Wide Open" (video—strings version)

UK limited-edition 7-inch single (670695 7)
A. "With Arms Wide Open" (new version) – 3:42
B. "With Arms Wide Open" (acoustic version) – 3:55

European CD single (WIN 669643 1)
 "With Arms Wide Open" (new version) – 3:42
 "With Arms Wide Open" (strings version) – 3:55

Australian and New Zealand enhanced CD single (670739 2)
 "With Arms Wide Open" (new version) – 3:42
 "Wash Away Those Years" – 6:04
 "One" – 5:02
 "With Arms Wide Open" (strings version) – 3:55
 "With Arms Wide Open" (video)

Charts

Weekly charts

Year-end charts

Decade-end charts

Certifications

Release history

Notes

References

External links
 Music video
 Song meaning

1990s ballads
1998 songs
2000 singles
Billboard Hot 100 number-one singles
Creed (band) songs
Epic Records singles
Grammy Award for Best Rock Song
Music videos directed by Dave Meyers (director)
Rock ballads
Songs about parenthood
Songs about pregnancy
Songs written by Mark Tremonti
Songs written by Scott Stapp
Wind-up Records singles